Niels Henry Gunnar Andreasen (March 31, 1914 – February 4, 1996) was a Danish boxer who competed in the 1936 Summer Olympics.

He was born in Faxe and died in Copenhagen.

In 1936 he was eliminated in the second round of the middleweight class after losing his fight to Tin Dekkers.

External links
profile

1914 births
1996 deaths
Middleweight boxers
Olympic boxers of Denmark
Boxers at the 1936 Summer Olympics
Danish male boxers